The First Interstate Tower fire was a high-rise fire that occurred on May 4, 1988, at the First Interstate Tower (now Aon Center) in Los Angeles, California, a 62-story, 860 foot (260 m) skyscraper, then the tallest building in the city.  The fire destroyed five floors of the building, injured 40 people, and caused the death of a maintenance worker, when the elevator he was riding opened onto the burning 12th floor.

Background 
The fire was so severe because the building was not equipped with fire sprinklers, which were not required for office towers at the time construction was completed in 1973.  A sprinkler system was 90% installed at the time of the fire but was inoperative, awaiting the installation of water flow alarms.

Fire 
The fire's origin has been attributed to overloading of electrical wiring by reactive distortion of lighting circuit currents. The fire was first alerted around 10:22pm on May 4, 1988 when a smoke detector on the 12th floor of the building activated. However, due to ongoing work on the sprinkler system being installed that evening, security personal immediately silenced the alarm, believing the activation to be a false alarm. Six minutes later, almost every smoke detectors from floors 12 thru 30 activated. The fire was not reported to emergency services until people outside the building called 911.

A maintenance worker, Alexander Handy, took a service elevator to the 12th floor in order to investigate the smoke detectors, however he ultimately died when the elevator opened onto the burning 12th floor. Around 50 people were believed to be occupying the building at the time of the fire, with 37 individuals injured including 3 firefighters. Five individuals were rescued from the rooftop via helicopter.

A total of 270 firefighters from 55 different companies and 4 helicopters were all called in to fight the fire. One firefighter with the Los Angeles Fire Department told reporters; "I was not sure we could hold it" due to the intensely hot blaze fueled by the synthetic fabrics and furnishings in the building. The fire, which resulted in $50 million in damages, was eventually contained at 2:19 AM.

Aftermath
According to the FEMA fire incident report, unusually good application of fireproofing on support members was a significant mitigating factor. The fireproofing used to protect the steel was Monokote supplied by GCP Applied Technologies (formerly W. R. Grace).

Repair work took four months. Because of the fire, Los Angeles building codes were changed, requiring all high-rises to be equipped with fire sprinklers. This modified a 1974 ordinance that only required new buildings to contain fire sprinkler systems.

Cultural references
The fire was dramatized in the 1991 telefilm, Fire: Trapped on the 37th Floor, starring Lee Majors, Lisa Hartman Black and Peter Scolari.

See also

 One Meridian Plaza - a 38-story building destroyed by fire 3 years later while a sprinkler system was being installed 
 Andraus Fire - a 1972 fire which burned through a 32-story building in Sao Paulo, Brazil.
 Joelma Fire - a 1974 fire which burned through a 25-story building in Sao Paulo, Brazil.
 2010 Shanghai fire – destroyed a 28-story high-rise
 Lakanal House fire – a 2009 fire in a tower block in Camberwell, South London
 2017 Plasco Building fire and collapse – in Tehran, Iran
 Grenfell Tower fire - a 14 June 2017 destruction of a London 24-story high-rise which had no sprinkler system
 PEPCON Disaster - a unrelated series of explosions, the largest is 1KT TNT equivalent, that happened in Henderson, Nevada the same day.

References

Further reading

External links 
 Los Angeles Fire Department Historical Archive: First Interstate Bank Fire

Fires in California
1988 in Los Angeles
1988 fires in the United States
Building and structure fires in the United States
May 1988 events in the United States
Commercial building fires
High-rise fires